The following roads are called the Veterans Parkway:
 Veterans Parkway (Savannah, Georgia), freeway within Chatham County
 Veterans Parkway (Conway, South Carolina), South Carolina Highway 22
 Veterans Parkway (Springfield, Illinois), Illinois Route 4
 Veterans Parkway (Bloomington–Normal, Illinois), Interstate 55 business loop
 Veterans Parkway (Sioux Falls, South Dakota), future South Dakota Highway 100
 Veterans Parkway (Manhattan Beach, California), half of the Beach Cities Greenway

See also 
 Veterans Memorial Highway